The Toy Museum of NY is a theatrical and performance based museum which uses the museum's collection for its performances and to tell the story of societal change. It was founded in 1999 as The Doll and Toy Museum of NYC and given its current name in 2009. Later that same year it moved from its original location in Cobble Hill to its permanent location on the second floor of Brooklyn Heights' St. Ann & the Holy Trinity Church. Among the locations for the museum's traveling locations are the Brooklyn Heights and Bay Ridge public library branches.

Collection
The museum's collection pays homage to the history of toys.  Established by Marlene Hochman, the museum is a traveling museum with performances, workshops and webinars.   In addition to rare dolls, the museum has a collection of classics like Mr. Potato Head, the original Frisbee pie pan, G.I. Joe and, the Easy-Bake Oven.

References

External links

Museums established in 1999
Museums in Brooklyn
Toy museums in the United States
1999 establishments in New York City